An electronic shelf label (ESL)  system is used by retailers for displaying product pricing on shelves. The product pricing is automatically updated whenever a price is changed under the control of a central server. Typically, electronic display modules are attached to the front edge of retail shelving.

Technological development of electronic shelf labels 

ESL modules use electronic paper (E-paper) or liquid-crystal display (LCD) to show the current product price to the customer. E-paper is widely used on ESLs as it provides crisp display and supports full graphic imaging while needing no power to retain an image.  A communication network allows the price display to be automatically updated whenever a product price is changed. This communication network is the true differentiation and what really makes ESL a viable solution. The wireless communication must support reasonable range, speed, battery life, and reliability. The means of wireless communication can be based on radio, infrared or even visible light communication. Currently, the ESL market leans heavily towards radio frequency based ESL solutions with additional integrations.

Early Electronic Price Label Product 
An early System first offered for sale by NCR in 1997 used Modulated Backscatter of radio waves as a way of providing two way wireless communications between the labels and the store’s radio network. By using modulated backscatter, the labels confirmed receipt of price changes (along with battery and display status) without the need for an active radio transmitter, thus saving cost and increasing battery life to over 5 years.

First generation: LCD and infrared communication 
Liquid crystal display ESL tags similar to how a calculator displays the numerical values. Each number on a liquid crystal display ESL tag is made up of seven bars and segments. The numerical value to display on the tags itself are then shown based on activating a different combinations of these seven bars and segments. A disadvantage of using a liquid crystal displayated tag is the difficulties in displaying certain letters. The communication technology used for the transmitter to connect to the label is through diffused infrared communication. The values on the LCD tags is established by infrared bouncing off of surfaces. However, the speed of transmission is heavily compromised due to the data compression of each data packets from the transmitter. Also, LCDs need power to retain an image.

Second generation: E-paper and Infrared or radio communication 
Electronic paper (E-paper) are sometimes referred to as electronic ink or e-ink. It describes a technology that mimics the appearance of ordinary ink on paper. An e-paper display is made up of capsules in a thin film, with each particles within the capsules emitting a different color and different electric charge. Electrodes are placed above and below the capsule film and when a charge is applied to an individual electrode, the color particle will move to either the top or the bottom of a capsule, allowing the ESL to display a certain color. E-paper generally uses infrared or radio communication technology to communicate from the transmitter to the tags. As for radio, typically, low frequency solution is used for simple tags, but with the draw backs of low data rate that makes it difficult to show segmented image.

Third generation: Geo-location and product finder 
The current generation of ESL units utilize e-paper display technology along with wireless radio communications, are integrated with existing retail technologies such as electronic article surveillance, digital signage, and people counters.  Therefore, retailers are able to upload a floor plan of the sales area into the label-management software.  Once this has been done and all the hardware and software pieces are in place, consumers are automatically tracked (in real time) through the network of people-counting devices, or via their personal Bluetooth devices, in order to determine their positioning within the store at all times.  In this way, the customer may be subjected to highly targeted, hyper-customized marketing initiatives.

General principles 

A typical ESL utilizes ultra-low-power CPU and wireless communication solutions to meet the power of low cost and low power, due to the high number of label tags required in an average retail store. ESL consists of three aspects to function.

Label management software: Responsible for the configuration of the system, configuration of the properties on the label itself, and to update the database for the list of prices Typically, a centralized software that is responsible for the building of and maintenance of the network for the data communication between the label management software and the terminal display.
Communication station: Responsible for the stability and reliability of transmittance through a long distance from the label management software to the label.
Terminal display: Functions as a receiver from the communication station to display the price configured from the label management software.

The label management software processes and packs the data of product information and the prices configured into packets of information. The data packets are then sent to the communication station via wireless network. Once the data packets are transmitted to the communication station, they will then be sent to the terminal display to update the price labels based on the information inputted into the label management software. A communication network allows the price display to be automatically updated whenever a product price is changed. This communication network is the true differentiation and what really makes ESL a viable solution. The wireless communication must support reasonable range, speed, battery life, and reliability. The means of wireless communication can be based on radio, infrared or even visible light communication. Currently, the ESL market leans heavily towards radio frequency based ESL solutions. The label will then act based on the instructions that was given in the data packets.

Hardware design 
The ESL hardware design generally includes the circuit design of the communication station and the terminal display label. The typical chipset used to perform the basic functional requirement of ESL is TI MSP432. The communication between the communication station and the terminal display label is controlled by a RF module, the general protocol for RF module uses CC2500 with a communication distance of upwards to 30 meters. For terminal display, it can be displayed via electronic ink, electronic paper or liquid crystal display.

Software design 
The software module of ESL is typically divided into three parts.

 Application module: Contains the database and manages the information of goods and the users to control the terminal display labels.
 Communication module: The communication module of the ESL contains the network and communication links required for the label management software to transmit the packet of information to the terminal display.
 Display module: The display of the ESL tag that utilizes either electronic ink, electronic paper, or liquid crystal display to output the information entered through the label management software.

The software mainly covers the network management, file systems, and transmission of data whereas the display module will be receiving transmission from the application module.

Usage of electronic shelf labels 
Electronic shelf labels are primarily used by retailers who sell their products in stores. The display modules are usually attached to the front edge of the retail shelves and display the price of the product. Additional information such as stock levels, expiration dates, or product information may also be displayed as well, depending on the type of ESL.

Benefits 
Automated ESL systems reduces pricing management labor costs, improves pricing accuracy and allows dynamic pricing. Dynamic pricing is the concept in which retailers can fluctuate pricing to match demand, online competition, inventory levels, shelf-life of items, and to create promotions. Some advantages of using electronic shelf labels are

 Accurate pricing: Prices on shelves are updated on time and on demand to match with price files on the label management software from a link between the in store point of sale processor and the label management software. This will increase pricing accuracy to avoid branding issues revolving around price integrity. As a result, decreasing the lost revenue from undervalued items, as consumers generally alert staffs of overpriced items, and not the inverse.
 Save costs: As opposed to traditional pricing labels, whenever prices are changed and updated; employees will no longer require to print out labels and manually replace them in the shelf tags. With ESL, this eliminates the need to visit each shelf and make changes as all changes are made in the label management software and updated to the labels digitally. This saves retailers on the materials and labor in producing and replacing printed tags, and offer the ability to update prices dynamically on demand.
 Product finder: Retailers are able to integrate each ESL tags with an external application to offer wayfinding capability for their products. A customer can input the product they are looking for either through a developed mobile application from the retailer, or through an external digital signage to direct the customer to the product's location. 
 In store heat map: Some ESL providers integrate with Bluetooth Low Energy enabled devices to track the movement of consumers and how long they remain at a particular location. This is done by displaying an image of the floor plan of the store on the label management software with a heat map showing locations of hot spots based on the detection of responses from high traffic areas through Bluetooth.
 Regulate stock levels: Inventory management is crucial for retailers. Inventory information may be displayed on ESL through connection with the point of sale processor. Additional information the ESL can display is an expected date on when the stock will refill on the shelf. ESL will also be able to display a quick response code to allow consumers to easily find the item online, or for retailers to display relevant product information to their consumers.

Disadvantages 
While there are benefits to ESL, it is not without its flaws. Some disadvantages of using electronic shelf labels are:

 Error propagation: As ESL are controlled by a label management software that regulates all ESL within a store or throughout an entire chain of company, any erroneous or undervalued price entered into the label management software will be reflected through the entire retail chain. 
 Inability to quantify return on investments: Due to the large volume of ESL a retailer will need for their stores, the initial investment cost for a store could be marginally high. This along with the inability to quantify whether consumer experience were improved during shopping due to the implementation of ESL makes it difficult to quantify the return on investment of ESL.

Market trends 
The ESL market has been expected to witness a growth throughout 2024 when global ESL industry are forecast to register more than 16% CAGR. The majority of end users for ESL belongs to the retail industry. The wide range of users ranges from groceries market, hardware stores, sports equipment, furniture, consumer appliances, and electronic and gadgets. This forecast growth is due to the increasing adoption of ESL by the retail industry as ESL are made more easily accessible for retail chains due to the reduction in pricing over time. 

With the rapid increase in the inclusion of Internet of things technology in the retail industry, with over 79% of retailers in the North America alone investing in ESL and people counter. 72% of these retailers in North America have plans to reinvent the supply chain management through adoption of ESL in their stores, thereby accelerating the market growth of ESL. Further studies show that Europe currently dominates the ESL market in terms of size, with over one-third of the total market share in 2017, due to the strong presence of domestic and multinational retailers in the region, Diebold Nixdorf AG, and Displaydata. However the market in APAC is expected to grow at the highest CAGR within the forecast period. The ESL market in the APAC region is segmented into China, Japan, Australia, Singapore, South Korea, and the rest of the region; the only prominent countries with significant market potential are China, Japan, Australia, Singapore, and South Korea. Additionally, the expansion of large scale retailers in the region is responsible for the expected high growth rate of the market. A study led by ABI Research said that the global ESL market could reach US$2 billion by 2019.

References 

Retail store elements
Electronic paper technology
Display technology